A flapper was a trendy young woman in the 1920s.

Flapper may also refer to:

 Flapper (company), a Brazilian transportation network company for aviation
 The Flapper, a 1920 American film directed by Alan Crosland
 Flapper valve, a part of some flush toilet mechanisms
 Flappers (TV series), a Canadian sitcom produced by the CBC in the late 1970s
 Flapper, a rock-climbing-related avulsion injury
 Flapper!, a play by Tim Kelly and Bill Francoeur
 QP:flapper, a two-member illustrator unit consisting of Japanese artists Tometa Ohara and Koharu Sakura